Amy Willcock is an American-born British-based cookery book writer, who having specialised in cooking on the AGA cooker, is popularly known as the "Queen of AGA cooking."

Born in Chicago, she moved to the UK with her young family in 1980. On discovering the AGA-cooker, she began developing recipes, and then became an AGA cookery demonstrator. Her first book "Aga Cooking" was published in October 2002 by Ebury Press.

She has since developed a dual-career, giving AGA Know How workshops around the UK, and as a cookery book author. Willcock appeared as judge on the 2010 edition of BBC One's Celebrity Masterchef.

Resident with her family on the Isle of Wight, Wilcock has two daughters, and runs the most successful Women's Institute group in the UK.

Publications

References

External links
Personal website
The George Hotel

Year of birth missing (living people)
Living people
Writers from Chicago
American chefs
Women cookbook writers
American emigrants to England
People from the Isle of Wight